Louis Laddie Koupal (December 19, 1898 – December 8, 1961) born in Tabor, South Dakota, was a pitcher for the Pittsburgh Pirates (1925–26),  Brooklyn Robins (1928–29), Philadelphia Phillies (1929–30) and St. Louis Browns (1937).

Koupal was of Czech descent. As a rookie in 1925, he appeared in six games, all in relief, for the Pirates, who would go on to win the World Series, though Koupal did not pitch in the postseason.

In six seasons, Koupal had a 10–21 won-lost record, 101 appearances, with 35 starts, 12 complete games, 40 games finished, 7 saves,  innings pitched, 436 hits allowed, 255 runs allowed, 208 earned runs allowed, 23 home runs allowed, 156 walks allowed, 87 strikeouts, 5 hit batsmen, 11 wild pitches, 1,560 batters faced and a career ERA of 5.58. 

Koupal died in San Gabriel, California at the age of 62.

External links

1898 births
1961 deaths
Baseball players from South Dakota
Major League Baseball pitchers
Pittsburgh Pirates players
Brooklyn Robins players
Philadelphia Phillies players
St. Louis Browns players
People from Bon Homme County, South Dakota
Hastings Cubs players
Omaha Buffaloes players
Kansas City Blues (baseball) players
Buffalo Bisons (minor league) players
Indianapolis Indians players
Baltimore Orioles (IL) players
Portland Beavers players
Mission Reds players
Sacramento Senators players
Seattle Indians players
San Francisco Seals (baseball) players
Tacoma Tigers players
Merced Bears players
American people of Czech descent